Vorontsovo is a rural locality (a village) in Fominskoye Rural Settlement, Sheksninsky District, Vologda Oblast, Russia. The population was 17 as of 2002.

Geography 
Vorontsovo is located 46 km southeast of Sheksna (the district's administrative centre) by road. Aleksino is the nearest rural locality.

References 

Rural localities in Sheksninsky District